Acacia nuperrima is a shrub of the genus Acacia and the subgenus Plurinerves that is endemic to a large area across northern Australia.

Description
It has multiple fine stems that branch near the base and has smooth grey to brown coloured bark and is slightly fissured toward the base. The branchlets have resin-crenulated ridges are finely lenticellate and are angled near the apices. Like most species of Acacia it has phyllodes rather than true leaves. It blooms from January to October and produces yellow flowers.

Distribution
It is native to an area in the Northern Territory and the Kimberley region of Western Australia where it is commonly situated along rivers and creeks, on ridges and plains and undulating country growing in sandy, sandy-clay or loamy or stony soils over and around sandstone or laterite. In Western Australia it is common around Cape Londonderry, Derby and along the Fitzroy River. It is mostly found in the north-western and north-eastern parts of the Northern Territory including many islands in the Gulf of Carpentaria with the range extending into north-western Queensland to around the Corinda area as a part of woodland, shrubland, savannah woodland or sometimes open forest communities where it is usually associated with species of Eucalyptus or Melaleuca.

See also
 List of Acacia species

References

nuperrima
Acacias of Western Australia
Flora of the Northern Territory
Plants described in 1926